European route E1 is a series of roads in Europe, part of the United Nations International E-road network, running from Larne, Northern Ireland to Seville, Spain. There is a sea crossing between Rosslare Harbour, in Ireland, and Ferrol, but no ferry service. The road also passes through Portugal – past the city of Porto, through the capital, Lisbon, and then south to the Algarve, passing Faro before reaching the Spanish border west of Huelva.

United Kingdom 

Larne (Start of concurrency with )
: Larne – Newtownabbey
Corr's Corner
: Newtownabbey
Sandyknowes Roundabout
: Newtownabbey – Belfast(Concurrency with )
York Street
: Belfast
Broadway
: Belfast – Lisburn 
Sprucefield(End of concurrency with )
: Lisburn – Newry
Killean

As with all E-roads in the United Kingdom, the E1 is not signed. It begins in Larne, County Antrim as the A8. A short section of the A8 at Newtownabbey is under motorway regulations and is signed as the A8(M) motorway. This motorway joins the much longer M2 motorway to Belfast. At Belfast, the road becomes the A12 Westlink, a dual carriageway which links to the M1 motorway. The A1 leaves the motorway near Lisburn and continues south as a dual carriageway. This takes the road over the border into Ireland near Newry.

Ireland 

Jonesborough
: Border – Dundalk
Ballymascanlan Interchange
: Dundalk – Dublin
M1 Turnapin(Start of concurrency with )
: Dublin(End of concurrency with)
()
: Dublin – Wexford
()
: Wexford - Rosslare(Concurrency with )
Rosslare Europort 

The dual carriageway continues in Ireland as the N1, which from Ballymascanlon in County Louth onwards is under motorway regulations and signed as the M1 motorway. The road follows the M1 south to Dublin, where, in the northern suburbs, it meets Dublin's ring road, the M50 motorway. It follows the M50 through the outer suburbs of Dublin until it meets the short M11 motorway near Shankill. The M11 continues as a dual carriageway, the N11, south of Bray in County Wicklow. This section passes through the Glen of the Downs Nature Reserve. This section of the road is dual carriageway or motorway to south of Gorey in County Wexford. Following this, the remainder of the route in Ireland is single carriageway and passes through several towns and villages. The N11 continues to Wexford, where at a junction outside the town it meets the N25 road from Cork. The route follows the N25 to its final destination in Ireland of Rosslare Europort.

All remaining sections of the N11 (and therefore E1) outside of Dublin are due to be replaced by motorways or dual carriageways.

Spain 

Ferrol 
: Ferrol
()
: Ferrol - AP-9
()
: A Coruña - Vigo
()
: Vigo - Tui
Tui

The E1 has two sections in Spain. The northern section is between Ferrol and Tui at the Portuguese border. It follows the motorway AP-9, a.k.a. The Atlantic Axis, which connects the Galician cities of Ferrol, A Coruña, Santiago de Compostela, Pontevedra and Vigo, continuing south towards Tui. The E1 follows the motorway A-55 near the city of Tui to the Portuguese border at the river Minho.

Portugal 

In Portugal, the route is composed of the following sections, always as a motorway (called auto-estrada in Portuguese):
: Valença (border) – Braga – Porto
: Porto
: Porto – Coimbra – Lisbon
: Lisbon – Montijo
: Montijo – Junction with A2
: Junction with A12 – Albufeira
: Albufeira – Castro Marim (border)

In the section Aveiro Norte – Lisbon of the A1, the E1 follows the same route as the E80. In that section the E80 signage prevails over the E1 signage, the latter rarely appearing.

Spain 

The second Spanish section is between Ayamonte at the Portuguese border and Seville. It follows the motorway A-49, and passes near the city of Huelva. The border is at the Guadiana river.

References

External links 
 UN Economic Commission for Europe: Overall Map of E-road Network (2007)

01
E001
E001
E001